

See also 
 Lists of fossiliferous stratigraphic units in Europe

References 
 

 Greece
Geology of Greece
Fossiliferous stratigraphic units